Rachelle Kunkel (born May 1, 1978) is an American diver. She competed at the 2004 Summer Olympics in Athens, in the women's 3 metre springboard.

References

External links

1978 births
Living people
American female divers
Olympic divers of the United States
Divers at the 2004 Summer Olympics
21st-century American women